United Nations Security Council resolution 1480, adopted unanimously on 19 May 2003, after reaffirming previous resolutions on East Timor (Timor-Leste), particularly resolutions 1410 (2002) and 1473 (2003), the council extended the mandate of the United Nations Mission of Support to East Timor (UNMISET) for a period of twelve months until 19 May 2004.

The Security Council praised the efforts of the East Timorese government and people in developing institutions for an independent state based on democratic values. UNMISET was also commended for developing infrastructure, public administration, law enforcement and defence capabilities. Furthermore, progress in diplomatic relations between East Timor and Indonesia was welcomed and progress with regard to security, border demarcation and bringing to justice those responsible for acts in 1999 was emphasised.

The resolution stressed the priority of improving the capabilities of the National Police of East Timor, the transfer of authority from UNMISET to the government of East Timor and international support throughout the process. A military strategy outlined in a report of the Secretary-General Kofi Annan was noted by the council.

See also
 1999 East Timorese crisis
 East Timor Special Autonomy Referendum
 Indonesian occupation of East Timor
 List of United Nations Security Council Resolutions 1401 to 1500 (2002–2003)
 United Nations Transitional Administration in East Timor

References

External links
 
Text of the Resolution at undocs.org

 1480
2003 in East Timor
 1480
May 2003 events